James Vincent (1882–1957) was an American actor and film director of the silent era. 

James Vincent may also refer to:

 James Vincent (footballer) (born 1989), English footballer
 James Vincent (priest) (1718–1783), Welsh Anglican priest and schoolmaster
 James Vincent (Dean of Bangor) (1792–1876), Welsh cleric
 James Edmund Vincent (1857–1909), Welsh barrister, journalist and author
 James L. Vincent (1940–2013), Chairman and CEO of Biogen Idec from 1985 to 2002
 James Vincent (basketball), Nigerian basketball coach
 James Carroll Vincent (1897–1948), silent movie actor
 James Vincent (stage manager) (1900-1957), stage manager, worked with Katherine Cornell and was long-time friend of George Cukor
 James E. Matthew Vincent, British newspaper editor and trade union leader